Õige mehe koda is a novel by Estonian author Karl Ristikivi. It was first published in 1940 by Ilukirjandus ja Kunst.

1940 novels
Novels by Karl Ristikivi